Sphodromantis pavonina is a species of praying mantis found in Angola, Cameroon, and the Congo River region.

See also
African mantis
List of mantis genera and species

References

P
Mantodea of Africa
Insects of Angola
Insects of Cameroon
Insects of the Central African Republic
Insects of the Democratic Republic of the Congo
Insects of Gabon
Insects of the Republic of the Congo
Insects described in 1955